Gøran van den Burgt (born 1 January 1990) is a Norwegian football midfielder who currently plays for Ready.

His father is Dutch. He started his career in Bjerkealliansen, but joined FC Lyn Oslo at the age of fifteen. He was the team captain of their U-20 team, In the summer of 2008 he gave up Lyn, and signed for Bærum SK, but ahead of the 2009 season he was signed by Lyn's senior team. He has one Norwegian Premier League game in 2009, making his debut on 22 March 2009 against Start. After the team went defunct in 2010, he left and joined Strømmen IF. He rejoined Lyn, now a 2. Divisjon team, in 2013.

In 2015, he went on to Ready.

References

1990 births
Living people
Footballers from Oslo
Norwegian people of Dutch descent
Norwegian footballers
Lyn Fotball players
Bærum SK players
Strømmen IF players
Eliteserien players
Norwegian First Division players
Association football midfielders